Stateless is the sixth and final studio album by Dirty Beaches. It was released on November 4, 2014 under Zoo Music.

The four-track album is an instrumental piece, and features Italian composer Vittorio Demarin.

Critical reception
Stateless was met with generally favorable reviews from critics. At Metacritic, which assigns a weighted average rating out of 100 to reviews from mainstream publications, this release received an average score of 67, based on 7 reviews.

Track listing

References

2014 albums
Dirty Beaches albums